Consols (originally short for consolidated annuities, but subsequently taken to mean consolidated stock) were government debt issues in the form of perpetual bonds, redeemable at the option of the government. They were issued by the Bank of England and the U.S. Government. The first British consols were issued in 1751. They have now been fully redeemed. The United States government issued consols from 1877 to 1930, which have likewise been redeemed.

History
In 1752 the Chancellor of the Exchequer and Prime Minister Sir Henry Pelham converted all outstanding issues of redeemable government stock into one bond, Consolidated 3.5% Annuities, in order to reduce the coupon (interest rate) paid on the government debt.

In 1757, the annual interest rate on the stock was reduced to 3%, leaving the stock as consolidated 3% annuities. The coupon rate remained at 3% until 1888. In 1888, the Chancellor of the Exchequer, George Joachim Goschen, converted the consolidated 3% annuities, along with reduced 3% annuities (issued in 1752) and new 3% annuities (1855), into a new bond, 2% consolidated stock, under the National Debt (Conversion) Act 1888 (Goschen's Conversion). Under the Act, the interest rate of the stock was reduced to 2% in 1903, and the stock given a first redemption date of 5 April 1923, after which point the stock could be redeemed at par value by Act of Parliament.

In 1927 Chancellor Winston Churchill issued a new government stock, 4% consols, as a partial refinancing of the National War Bonds issued in 1917 during World War I.

Timeline of 2.5% consolidated stock

Final redemption
On 31 October 2014 the UK Government announced that it would redeem the 4% consols in full in early 2015. It did so on 1 February 2015, and redeemed the 3% and 3% bonds between March and May of that year. The final 2% and 2% bonds were redeemed on 5 July 2015. Section 124 of the Finance Act 2015 made the legal provisions for the ending of the consol.

References in literature
Given their long history, references to consols can be found in many places, including Pride and Prejudice by Jane Austen, David Copperfield by Charles Dickens, Howards End by E. M. Forster, Vanity Fair by William Makepeace Thackeray, Of Human Bondage by William Somerset Maugham and The Forsyte Saga by John Galsworthy.

See also

War bond#United Kingdom
The Swiss National Bank shares work similarly to a consol.

References

External links
Annuity Certificates of the Bank of England Consolidated Annuities
CREATING THE CONSOLS- A brief history of the origins of Britain's 3% perpetual bonds

Government bonds issued by the United Kingdom
1751 introductions
1751 in Great Britain
Economic history of the United Kingdom
Public finance of the United Kingdom
Politics of the Kingdom of Great Britain

zh:金边债券